Schaumburg Township is one of 29 townships in Cook County, Illinois, USA.  As of the 2010 census, its population was 131,288. It is in the north west corner of Cook County.

Cities, towns, villages 
 Elk Grove Village
 Hanover Park
 Hoffman Estates
 Rolling Meadows (south edge)
 Roselle
 Schaumburg
 Streamwood

Adjacent townships 
 Palatine Township (north)
 Elk Grove Township (east)
 Addison Township, DuPage County (southeast)
 Bloomingdale Township, DuPage County (south)
 Wayne Township, DuPage County (southwest)
 Hanover Township (west)
 Barrington Township (northwest)

Cemeteries 
The township contains Greve Cemetery.

Major highways 
  Interstate 90
  Interstate 290
  U.S. Route 20
  Illinois Route 19
  Illinois Route 53
  Illinois Route 58
  Illinois Route 72

Airports and landing strips 
 Marriott Heliport
 Schaumburg Helistop
 Schaumburg Regional Airport

Lakes 
 George Lake
 Merkle Lake
 Moon Lake
 Unity Lake
 Volkening Lake

Landmarks 
 Busse Woods Forest Preserve
 Schaumburg Regional Airport

Demographics

Political districts
Illinois's 8th congressional district
 State House District 44
 State House District 56
 State House District 66
 State Senate District 22
 State Senate District 28
 State Senate District 33

See also
Schaumburg Township District Library

References
 
 United States Census Bureau 2007 TIGER/Line Shapefiles
 United States National Atlas

External links
 Schaumburg Township official website
 City-Data.com
 Illinois State Archives
 Township Officials of Illinois
 Cook County official site

Townships in Cook County, Illinois
Townships in Illinois